Ülo Tuulik (born 22 February 1940, in Abruka Island, Saare County) is an Estonian writer.

In 1963 he graduated from Tartu State University in philology. 1964-1966 he was the chairman of Young Authors' Association in Tallinn. Since 1974 he was a member of Estonian Writers' Union.

His twin brother was writer Jüri Tuulik (1940-2014) and his cousin was writer Juhan Smuul.

Selected works
 1972: prose collection Vihm Gibraltaris
 1974: novel Sõja jalus ('In the Way of War') 
 1979: prose collection Atlandi kirjad: jutustused

References

Living people
1940 births
Estonian male novelists
Estonian male poets
Estonian editors
20th-century Estonian poets
21st-century Estonian poets
Estonian twins
University of Tartu alumni
People from Saaremaa Parish